was a Japanese politician of the Liberal Democratic Party, a member of the House of Representatives in the Diet (national legislature). A native of Fujisaki, Aomori and graduate of Toyo University, he was elected to the House of Representatives for the first time in 1996 after serving in the Aomori Prefectural Assembly for two terms.

He died of cancer on July 25, 2017, at a hospital in Tokyo, aged 52.

References

External links 
  

1965 births
2017 deaths
Politicians from Aomori Prefecture
Members of the House of Representatives (Japan)
Liberal Democratic Party (Japan) politicians
21st-century Japanese politicians
Deaths from cancer in Japan
Deaths from pancreatic cancer
Members of the Aomori Prefectural Assembly